Al-'Aqida al-Tahawiyya or Bayan al-Sunna wa al-Jama'a is a popular exposition of Sunni Muslim doctrine written by the tenth-century Egyptian theologian and Hanafi jurist Abu Ja'far al-Tahawi.

Summary 
The sole aim of al-Tahawi was to give a summary of the theological views of Abu Hanifa, the founder of the Hanafi school, as he states at the very beginning of his work that it is written in accordance to the methodology of the jurists, Abu Hanifa, Abu Yusuf and Muhammad ibn al-Hasan al-Shaybani. However, it can be said to represent the creed of both the Ash'aris and the Maturidis, especially the latter, given his being a follower of the Hanafi school. The Shafi'i scholar Taj al-Din al-Subki (d. 771/1370) writes that the followers of the four main schools of law, the Hanafis, the Malikis, the Shafi'is and the Hanbalis are all one in creed: 

The doctrines enumerated in this work are entirely derived from the Qur'an and the authentic Hadith. It starts with the monotheistic oneness of God, then goes on to the assertion of His positive and eternal attributes. Al-Tahawi asserts the reality of the beatific vision without  modality (bila kayf). Most of the other theoretical issues relating to the next world are not rationally explained. God can predetermine some people to be happy and others to be miserable. Knowledge of the decree of God is not given to mankind. Belief consists of assent by heart and confession by tongue. Sinners cannot be declared to be unbelievers. The actions of man are the creation of God and the acquisition of man.

Commentators 
Several scholars have written commentaries on this work. Among them are the following:
 Isma'il ibn Ibrahim al-Shaybani (d. 629/1231).
 Najm al-Din Mankubars (d. 652/1254).
 Mahmud al-Qunawi (d. 771/1369), entitled al-Qala'id fi Sharh al-'Aqa'id.
  (d. 733/1332).
  (d. 773/1371).
 Akmal al-Din al-Babarti (d. 786/ 1384).
 Ibn Abi al-'Izz (d. 792/1390). His commentary is rejected by both Maturidis and Ash'aris, accepted and praised by the Salafis.
 Hasan Kafi al-Aqhisari/Pruščak (d. 1025/1616), entitled Nur al-Yaqin fi Usul al-Din.
 'Abd al-Ghani al-Maydani (d. 1298/1880).
 Qari Muhammad Tayyib (d. 1403/1983).
 Ahmad Jabir Jubran (d. 1425/2004).
 'Abdullah al-Harari (d. 1429/2008).
  (d. 1436/2015).
 Sa'id Foudah. 
 Nidal Ibrahim Alah Rashi.

Contents 
The texts raises many points of creed that are essential matters and defines the belief of the Sunni Muslim, covering following the topics:
 Exposition of the Creed of Ahl al-Sunnah wa al-Jama'ah
 Divine Unity
 Allah's Eternal and Everlasting Names and Attributes
 Allah's Preordination
 Muhammad (S) and His Description
 The Qur'an: the Eternal Word of Allah
 The Beatific Vision
 The Prophet's Night Journey (S) and Ascension
 The Prophet's Basin (S) and Intercession
 The Covenant Made with Adam (a.s) and His Progeny
 Divine Decree and Predetermination
 The Preserved Tablet and the Pen
 Allah's Attribute of Creating
 The Throne and the Footstool
 The Angels, the Prophets and the Revealed Books
 Declaring the People of the Qiblah to be Muslims
 Debating about Allah's Essence
 Arguing about the Qur'an
 The Impermissibility of Accusing a Muslim of Disbelief
 The Meaning of Faith
 Faith Neither Increases nor Decreases
 The Fate of Major Sinners
 The Status of a Muslim
 Rebelling Against Muslim Leaders
 Wiping Over Footwear
 Hajj and Jihad
 The Guardian Angels who were Scribes
 The Grave and its States
 Resurrection
 Paradise and Hellfire
 The Ability that Accompanies Acts
 Slaves' Actions
 Supplication and Alms on Behalf of the Deceased
 Allah's Wrath and Pleasure
 Loving the Companions of the Prophet (S)
 The Order of the Caliphate
 The Ten Given the Glad Tidings of Paradise
 Speaking Well of Scholars
 The Rank of Sainthood
 Portents of the Final Hour
 Diviners and Soothsayers
 Adhering to the Congregation

Manuscripts 

Translations

English edition 
The work has been translated into English and published under the title:
 Islamic Belief, translated and published in 1995 by IQRA International Educational Foundation.
 Islamic Belief: Al-Aqidah at-Tahawiah (Revised Edition), edited by Iqbal Ahmad Azami. Translated and published in 2002 by UK Islamic Academy.
 The Creed of At-Tahawiyy (A Brief Explanation of The Sunniy Creed), 2nd edition published in 2003 by The Association of Islamic Charitable Projects in USA.
 Aqeedatul Tahawi, with commentary by Qari Muhammad Tayyib, the former rector of Darul Uloom Deoband. English translation by Afzal Hoosen Elias. First published in 2007 by Zam Zam Publishers.
 The Creed of Imam al-Tahawi, translated, introduced and annotated by Hamza Yusuf. First published in 2009 by Fons Vitae.
 The Creed of Imam Tahawi, translated by Mohammad Ibrahim Teymori. According to the translator himself, this translation is heavily indebted to the works of Hamza Yusuf and Iqbal Ahmad Azami.
Al-'Aqidat at-Tahawiyyah (Kindle Edition), translated by Tahir Mahmood Kiani. First published in 2012 by T. M. Kiani.
 Al-'Aqida al-Tahawiyya: Arabic Text with English Translation and Commentary, translated and prepared by Fahim Hoosen. This edition includes a brief and simple commentary. First published in 2015 by Azhar Academy. The second edition published by Dar Ul Thaqafah in 2018.
 Commentary on the Creed of at-Tahawi by Ibn Abi al-Izz (731-792 AH), translated by Muhammad Abdul-Haqq Ansari. First published in 2017 by Istinarah Press.
 Imam al-Tahawi's Creed of Islam: An Exposition, translated by Amjad Mahmood. This edition includes a commentary by the Hanafi scholar, judge and Maturidi theologian  (d. 773/1372). First published in 2020 by Heritage Press.

French edition 
 La 'Aqîda Tahâwiyya (La profession de foi des gens de la Sunna), translated and commented on by Corentin Pabiot. Published in 2015 by Maison d'Ennour.

Malay edition 
 Terjemahan Al-Aqidah Al-Thahawiyyah, translated by Raja Ahmad Mukhlis al-Azhari.

Persian edition 
 Aqida Tahawi, translated by Mohammad Ibrahim Teymori, with foreword by Saeed Ahmad Palanpuri.
 Aqida Tahawi, translated by Sa'di Mahmudi.

Russian edition 
 Акыда ат-Тахавийя, translated with notes by Ahmad Abu Yahya al-Hanafi.

Turkish edition 
 Tahâvî Şerhi Bâbertî Tercümesi, translated with commentary of Akmal al-Din al-Babarti (d. 786/1384) by İsmailağa Fıkıh ve Te'lif Kurulu.
 Tâhâvi Akâidi Baberti Şerhi, translated with commentary of al-Babarti (d. 786/1384) by İzzet Karasakal.
 İslam Akâid Metinleri, translated by Ali Pekcan.

Urdu edition 
 Sharh al-'Aqidah al-Tahawiyyah, translated with commentary by Ehsanullah Shayeq.
 Al-Aseedah as-Samawiyyah Sharh al-Aqeedah At-Tahawiyyah, translated with commentary by Rida-ul-Haq.
 'Aqidat al-Tahawi wa al-'Aqidah al-Hasanah, translated by Abd al-Hamid Khan Swati. The book contains two works on aqidah translated and published together due to sharing the same topic. The first is al-'Aqida al-Tahawiyya, and the second is al-Aqidah al-Hasanah of Shah Waliyyullah.

Uzbek edition 
 Aqidatut Tahoviya sharhining talxiysi, Muhammad Anwar Badakhshani's "Talkhees Sharh Al Aqeedah Al-Tahawiyya" translated by Sheikh Muhammad Sadik Muhammad Yusuf.

Further reading 
 The Creed of Imam Al-Tahawi; 
 Voices of Islam: Voices of tradition, p 208.

See also 

 Al-Fiqh al-Akbar
 Al-Sawad al-A'zam
 Al-'Aqida al-Nasafiyya
 Kitab al-Tawhid
 List of Sunni books

References

External links 
 Al-'Aqida al-Tahawiyya by Iqbal Ahmed A'zami
 Imam al-Tahawi's beliefs of Ahl Al-Sunna wa Al-Jama'a — As-Sunnah Foundation of America
 Al-'Aqida al-Tahawiyya (Arabic Text with English Translation)
 Arabic Commentaries and Resources for al-'Aqida al-Tahawiyya
 Scholarly verdicts on Ibn Abi al-'Izz and his Sharh on al-'Aqida al-Tahawiyya

Sunni literature
Hanafi literature
Islamic theology books
Islamic belief and doctrine
Maturidi literature